Dürrinev Kadın ("young shine"; called also Dürrünev Kadın, born Princess Melek Dziapş-lpa; "Angel"; 15 March 1835 – 4 December 1895) was the BaşKadin of Sultan Abdulaziz of the Ottoman Empire.

Early life
Dürrinev Kadın was born on 15 March 1835 in Batumi, Georgia. Born as princess Melek Dziapş-lpa, she was a member of the Abkhazian Dziapş-lpa family. Her father was prince Mahmud Bey Dziapş-lpa, and her mother was princess Halime Hanım Çikotua, an Abkhazian. She had two younger sisters. The first was princess Ayşe Kemalifer Hanım (1838 – 1901. She married Ömer Pasha. Her younger daughter, Esma Süreyya Cavidan Hanım became the second consort of Durrinev's son, Şehzade Yusuf Izzeddin, while one of her grandaughters, Emine Nurbanu Hidayet Hanim became a consort of Şehzade Mehmed Burhaneddin, son of Sultan Abdülhamid II). The second was princess Aliye Hanım, who married prince Ismail Çikotua and was mother of Nazperver Kadın, consort of Sultan Mehmed V.

She had been brought to Istanbul as a young child, where her father entrusted her to the imperial harem together with her sister Ayşe. The two of them were then placed in the service of Sultan Abdulmejid I's first wife Servetseza Kadın, where her name according to the custom of the Ottoman court was changed to Dürrinev. She was given a good education: she spoke French without an accent, she was a good pianist and a good painter. She made paintings which he gave to Bezmiâlem Sultan and Servetseza Kadin. She was blonde and with hazel eyes.

Marriage
One day, when Abdulaziz was in his twenties, he visited his sister-in-law Servetseza Kadın. Here he saw Dürrinev, then twenty one years old, and fell in love with her. He asked his sister-in-law to give him Dürrünev in marriage, but she flatly refused. However, after the prince's pleading to Servetseza, she acceded to her brother-in-law's demand. The marriage took place on 20 May 1856 in the Dolmabahçe Palace.

Dürrinev gave birth to the couple's first child, a son, Şehzade Yusuf Izzeddin on 11 October 1857, who was Abdülaziz's favorite son. Since her husband was not yet sultan, they were forbidden to have children. The child was then hidden until his father ascended the throne. After Abdulaziz's accession to the throne on 25 June 1861, Dürrünev was installed the principal consort with the title of "BaşKadin". On 10 August 1862, she gave birth to her second child, a daughter, Fatma Saliha Sultan. Four years later, on 28 October 1866, she gave birth to her third child, a son, Şehzade Mehmed Selim, who died at the age of one on 21 October 1867.

In 1869, she met with the Princess of Wales Alexandra of Denmark, when the latter visited Istanbul with her husband Prince of Wales Edward (future Edward VII). Maria Georgina Grey described her during the visit:

Abdulaziz was deposed by his ministers on 30 May 1876, his nephew Murad V became the Sultan. He was transferred to Feriye Palace the next day. Dürrinev, and other women of Abdulaziz's entourage didn't wanted to leave the Dolmabahçe Palace. So they were grabbed by hand and were send out to the Feriye Palace. Dürrinev was imprisoned in the rooms above Abdülaziz's with Şemifer e Zevkyab Hanım. In the process, they were searched from head to toe and everything of value was taken from them. On 4 June 1876, Abdulaziz died under mysterious circumstances. When his body was shown to Dürrinev, she fainted.

Death
Abdülaziz's wives were released on Abdülhamid II's accession to the throne in September 1876, but Dürrinev continued to live in Feriye Palace.
Dürrinev Kadın died on 4 December 1895 at the Feriye Palace, and was buried in the mausoleum of Sultan Mahmud II, located at Divan Yolu street, Istanbul.

Issue

See also
Kadın (title)
Ottoman Imperial Harem
List of consorts of the Ottoman sultans

References

Sources

 

 

1835 births
1895 deaths
19th-century consorts of Ottoman sultans
People from Batumi
People from the Ottoman Empire of Abkhazian descent